The church of the Exaltation of the Holy Cross or Esaltazione della Santa Croce is a Roman Catholic parish church, located in Pastrengo, province of Verona, region of Veneto, Italy.

History
The present church was erected  in 1757 to replace an older church. The main altar (1788), made of polychrome marble, shelters the main oil canvas altarpiece depicting Saint Helen adoring the Cross by Francesco Lorenzi. This painting is flanked by canvases: Christ and the Aldulterous Woman (17th-century) attributed to Lonardi, and a Susannah and the Elders before the Judges (18th-century). In the presbytery are two altarpieces (1726): one depicting the Discovery of the Cross and the other, the Sign of the Cross appears to Constantine.

Notes

18th-century Roman Catholic church buildings in Italy
Churches in the province of Verona
Roman Catholic churches completed in 1757